Steinskaret Gap is an ice-filled gap in the central Kurze Mountains, just south of Steinskaregga Ridge. Mapped from surveys and air photos by Norwegian Antarctic Expedition (1956–60) and named Steinskaret (the stone gap).

Mountain passes of Queen Maud Land
Princess Astrid Coast